Allende Municipality is a municipality located in the northeastern Mexican state of Nuevo León. It comprises a region known as Región Citrícola (Citrus Region), for being a major producer of orange at local, national and even international level. Allende is located at the Sierra Madre Oriental range foothills in the central-southeastern part in the state of Nuevo León. It has a territorial extension of 148.5 km², comprising around 0.22% of the whole extension of Nuevo León. Given its geographic location, the region consists of valleys and hills ranging from 300 meters above sea level on the northeast, to 1,640 meters above sea level in the southwestern part of the municipality. According to the last census data in 2010, it has 32,581 inhabitants, of whom 16,436 are men and 16,145 are women. The main economic activities are agriculture, livestock, beekeeping (Allende is one of the largest producers of honey in Mexico), poultry and transportation, activities that generate many jobs in the region. A sister city of Allende is Conroe, Texas.

Location
The municipality is located around 46.7 km. (30 miles) on the highway to Linares, southwards Monterrey. It borders the municipality of Santiago to the north and northeast, going throughout the Sierra Madre Oriental and the stream of Cerro Las Cruces. It's also bounded on the north by the municipality of Cadereyta Jiménez, having as natural boundary streams of the Lazarillos and Los Nogales, where they converge with Ramos River. 
Allende also borders the municipality of Montemorelos to the northeast, east, southeast and south.

History
Prior the arrival of the first Spanish settlers to the New Kingdom of León in the late sixteenth century, these lands were inhabited by a group of indigenous people of Chichimeca origin called Huachichiles, that prevented the penetration of settlers to the region called "Cuarisezapa" that stretched from the outskirts of Monterrey until Guajuco Valley in what today are the municipalities of Santiago and Allende, they were shortly expelled when the Spanish arrived.

The Spanish promoted the colonization of the area and founded the Cuarisezapa Guajuco Valley, comprising an area to the Ramos river. Its first settler was Captain Diego Rodriguez de Montemayor, grandson of the founder of Monterrey Diego de Montemayor, who received a grant from Governor Martin de Zavala in 1646 and two years later expanded it by a purchase to Diego Fernandez de Montemayor. When he died, his widow Ines de la Garza with her children continued working on livestock, agriculture in the haciendas.

General Luis Garcia de Pruneda owned large estates in the vicinity of these lands by the 1700s, when he died in 1739, he desired that a part of his properties were devoted to charitable works, so in 1749 was promoted the creation of two chaplaincies that included what today are the municipalities of Allende, Cadereyta Jimenez and Montemorelos.

Government

Municipal presidents

Tourism

The Ramos River attracts many visitors for its landscapes, another tourist site is El paseo de la Loma de la Santa Cruz (Loma de la Santa Cruz's walk) which offers a panoramic view from the municipal seat. Other tourist sites are the Plaza Zaragoza, in front of town Hall and Plaza Mariano Escobedo. The Parroquia de San Pedro Apóstol (Parish of St. Peter Apostle), which is a modern building on a smaller scale replica of St. Peter's Basilica in Rome, the Museum of Anthropology, History and Culture House in the Old Temple, the shrine of Our Lady of Light at Rancho El Cerro, the Hacienda del provisor, the collection gallery of Bernardo Flores Salazar and the municipal palace.

Museums

The ancient temple of San Pedro Apostol, is now a museum that houses the history and culture of the municipality, along with antiquities of items and depictions of life-style of the town.

References

External links 
 Official website of Allende

Municipalities of Nuevo León